Richfield Township is one of the thirteen townships of Henry County, Ohio, United States. As of the 2010 census the population was 682.

Geography
Located in the eastern part of the county, it borders the following townships:
Damascus Township - north
Weston Township, Wood County - northeast corner
Milton Township, Wood County - east
Jackson Township, Wood County - southeast corner
Bartlow Township - south
Marion Township - southwest corner
Monroe Township - west
Harrison Township - northwest corner

No municipalities are located in Richfield Township, although the unincorporated community of Grelton lies on its border with Monroe Township.

Name and history
Statewide, other Richfield Townships are located in Lucas and Summit counties.

Government
The township is governed by a three-member board of trustees, who are elected in November of odd-numbered years to a four-year term beginning on the following January 1. Two are elected in the year after the presidential election and one is elected in the year before it. There is also an elected township fiscal officer, who serves a four-year term beginning on April 1 of the year after the election, which is held in November of the year before the presidential election. Vacancies in the fiscal officership or on the board of trustees are filled by the remaining trustees.

References

External links
County website

Townships in Henry County, Ohio
Townships in Ohio